Trematocephalus is a genus of sheet weavers first described by Friedrich Dahl in 1886.

Species
, it contains only four species:
 Trematocephalus cristatus (Wider, 1834) — Palearctic. "A striking red and blue-black money spider with a hole straight through its head."
 Trematocephalus obscurus Denis, 1950 — France
 Trematocephalus simplex Simon, 1894 — Sri Lanka
 Trematocephalus tripunctatus Simon, 1894 — Sri Lanka

References

Linyphiidae
Araneomorphae genera
Spiders of Asia
Palearctic spiders
Taxa named by Friedrich Dahl